Hickoryville is an unincorporated community in Warren County, in the U.S. state of Ohio.

History
The community was named for a grove of hickory trees near the original town site.

References

Unincorporated communities in Warren County, Ohio